Jennifer Jane Saunders (born 6 July 1958) is an English actress, comedian, singer and screenwriter. Saunders originally found attention in the 1980s, when she became a member of The Comic Strip after graduating from the Royal Central School of Speech and Drama with her best friend and comedy partner, Dawn French. With French, she co-wrote and starred in their eponymous sketch show, French and Saunders, for which they jointly received a BAFTA Fellowship in 2009. Saunders later received acclaim in the 1990s for writing and playing her character Edina Monsoon in her sitcom Absolutely Fabulous.

Early life
Jennifer Jane Saunders was born on 6 July 1958 in Sleaford, Lincolnshire, England. Her mother, Barbara Jane Saunders née Duminy, was a biology teacher, born in France, and her father, Robert Thomas Saunders, served as a pilot in the Royal Air Force (RAF). He reached the rank of group captain, and later worked for British Aerospace. She has three brothers. As her father was in the armed forces during her childhood years, Saunders changed schools many times. She was educated from the age of five to 18 in boarding schools and then at St Paul's Girls' School, an independent school in west London. After school, she worked for a year in Italy as an au pair.

In 1977, Saunders received a place at the Central School of Speech and Drama in London on a drama teachers' course, where she met her future comedy partner, Dawn French. French and Saunders came from RAF backgrounds, and had grown up on the same base, even having had the same best friend, without ever meeting. The comic duo originally did not get on well, and as far as Saunders was concerned, French was a "cocky little upstart". The distrust was mutual: French considered Saunders snooty and uptight. French wanted to become a drama teacher, whereas Saunders loathed the idea and had not fully understood what the course was about; thus, she disliked French for being enthusiastic and confident about the course. Saunders was shocked to find that she was taking a course to become a teacher, as her mother had filled in the application form. Her mother was saddened when Saunders chose not to apply for an Oxbridge university education.

After the initial friction experienced while at college, French and Saunders shared a flat together. French has remarked on Saunders' messy habits when sharing the house saying: "When we lived together in Chalk Farm, she had a room at the top of the house. We got broken into and the police said, 'Well, it is quite bad, but the worst is that room at the top.' And, of course, nobody had been in there." The two performed together after graduation, working the festival, cabaret, and stand-up circuits. They formed a double-act called The Menopause Sisters. Saunders described the act, which involved wearing tampons in their ears, as "cringeworthy." The manager of the club where they performed recalled, "They didn't seem to give a damn. There was no star quality about them at all."

Career

Early career
French and Saunders would eventually come to public attention as members of the informal comedy collective The Comic Strip, part of the alternative comedy scene in the early 1980s. They answered a 1980 advert in The Stage newspaper looking for female comedians to perform at The Comic Strip, which had, until that point, only had male performers. When they walked into the audition, they were immediately told, "You're booked. When can you start?" They became continuing members of The Comic Strip, which included Adrian Edmondson, Rik Mayall, Peter Richardson, and Robbie Coltrane.

The group performed at the Boulevard Theatre, above Soho's Raymond Revuebar, and gained a cult following, with visiting audience members including Dustin Hoffman, Jack Nicholson, and Robin Williams, who once joined in the performance. By the time French and Saunders became members of The Comic Strip, French was already working as a drama teacher, whilst Saunders was on the dole and spending much of her time in bed.

1980s and 1990s
The comedy group appeared on Channel 4's first night on air, in the first episode of The Comic Strip Presents: Five Go Mad In Dorset, broadcast on 2 November 1982. In the episodes "Bad News" and "More Bad News", Saunders plays a trashy rock journalist touring with the fictional heavy metal band Bad News.

In 1985, Saunders starred in and co-wrote Girls on Top with French, Tracey Ullman, and Ruby Wax, which portrayed four eccentric women sharing a flat in London. Saunders also appeared in Ben Elton's Happy Families where she played various members of the same family, including all four Fuddle sisters in the six-episode BBC situation comedy. Saunders starred in a Comic Strip film called The Supergrass, a parody of slick 1980s police dramas, directed by Peter Richardson. Saunders played Meryl Streep playing Arthur Scargill's wife in Strike, a Comic Strip spoof on the 1984 miners' strike. She appeared twice as a guest on The Young Ones.

In 1987, she and French created French and Saunders, a popular sketch comedy series for the BBC which sporadically aired until 2007, often with long gaps between series. Saunders also appeared in Amnesty International's The Secret Policeman's Biggest Ball live benefit in 1989, along with Dawn French and others.

Saunders and French followed separate careers as well as irregularly maintaining their comedy sketch show. Saunders' biggest solo success has been Absolutely Fabulous, based largely on a 14-minute French & Saunders sketch called "Modern Mother and Daughter". Saunders and French were going to star together, but, just as the studio had been booked, French received a long-awaited phone call confirming an adoption agency had a baby for her to adopt.

Saunders proceeded to star in the comedy. The series, which she wrote and starred in as the irresponsible fashion PR agent Edina Monsoon alongside Joanna Lumley, who played Patsy Stone, brought her international acclaim and attention. The show ran for five full series, two telemovies, three special episodes, and a feature film over the course of twenty-four years from 1992 to 2016. The series is also known as Ab Fab and was broadcast in the United States on Comedy Central and BBC America, becoming cult viewing.

Saunders has appeared on the American sitcoms Roseanne, playing Edina Monsoon in the episode "Satan, Darling", and Friends as Andrea Waltham, the step-mother of Emily, Ross Geller's fiancée, in the episodes "The One After Ross Says Rachel" and "The One with Ross's Wedding". Although they share no scenes, Jennifer's Absolutely Fabulous co-star June Whitfield also appeared in The One With Ross's Wedding Part Two as the Walthams’ housekeeper. In 1999, she appeared alongside French in Let Them Eat Cake.

2000s

Saunders wrote and starred in a comedy drama about a Women's Institute entitled Jam & Jerusalem, also known as Clatterford in the United States. The first series aired in 2006, the second in 2008, and the third in 2009 on BBC One. The show starred David Mitchell, Sally Phillips, and Sue Johnston, as well as Dawn French and Joanna Lumley.

In 2007, Saunders and psychologist Tanya Byron wrote BBC Two's The Life and Times of Vivienne Vyle about a neurotic daytime talk show host. The show ran for one series. Saunders played the eponymous character whose programme features crude headlines such as "Wife a slapper? Lie detector reveals all".

Also in 2007, the final series of French & Saunders aired. A Bucket o' French & Saunders featured a compilation of old and new sketches and aired on BBC One in September 2007. It was the third show she had written in a year. In 2008 and 2009, French & Saunders completed their final live tour, French & Saunders: Still Alive.

Saunders appeared on the "Star in a Reasonably Priced Car" segment of BBC Two's motoring show Top Gear, posting a lap time of 1:46.1s, making her the fifth-fastest guest ever in the car that was used at that time. A self-confessed petrolhead, she has a passion for Alfa Romeos and has so far owned four.

2010s
In 2011, Saunders wrote and appeared in "Uptown Downstairs Abbey", the Comic Relief parody of the critically acclaimed historical television dramas Downton Abbey and Upstairs Downstairs. Playing the Dowager Countess, she starred alongside Lumley, Kim Cattrall, Victoria Wood, Harry Enfield, Patrick Barlow, Dale Winton, Olivia Colman, Tim Vine, Simon Callow, Michael Gambon, and Harry Hill.

In 2012, Saunders guest-starred in Dead Boss, a BBC Three comedy set in the fictional Broadmarsh prison where she plays the cruel and work-shy governor, Margaret. The show's creator, Sharon Horgan, stated that she 'begged' Saunders to take the role, having been a fan of Saunders' previous comedy work.

She also wrote the script for the Spice Girls-based jukebox musical Viva Forever!

In 2013, Saunders starred as Lady Constance Keeble in the BBC adaptation of Blandings by P. G. Wodehouse. In 2017, Saunders appeared on the Simpsons episode "Looking for Mr. Goodbart" as an elderly woman accompanied around by Bart.

Film
Saunders has also appeared in several films, such as In the Bleak Midwinter (1995), Muppet Treasure Island (1996), Fanny & Elvis (1999), and also made cameo appearances in the Spice Girls' film Spice World (1997) and Absolument fabuleux (2001), a French film based on Absolutely Fabulous.

In the animated film, Shrek 2, she provided the voice of the Fairy Godmother and singing the songs "The Fairy Godmother Song" and "Holding Out for a Hero". Her part took only four days to record. The sequel broke the first Shreks own box office record in the U.S in just a fortnight, and it proceeded to make $353 million in just three weeks in the U.S.

Her role won the People's Choice Award for the best movie villain in 2005. She voiced Miss Spink in the animated film Coraline, in which her comedy partner Dawn French voiced a character called Miss Forcible. In 2015, she voiced Queen Elizabeth II in the animated film Minions, and in 2016, she voiced Miss Nana Noodleman in the animated film Sing, reprising the role again in Sing 2.

In 2022 she starred in Death on the Nile as Marie Van Schuyler alongside Dawn French, Gal Gadot and Kenneth Branagh who also directed the film.

Theatre

In 2018 Saunders appeared at the Vaudeville Theatre in the production of ‘Lady Windermere’s Fan’ as The Duchess of Berwick.

In June 2019 she appeared on stage in the production of Noël Cowards play ‘Blithe Spirit’ as eccentric clairvoyant Madam Arcati. The show first opened at Theatre Royal Bath, and after a short tour of England it later transferred to the Duke of York’s Theatre, London in March 2020. Two weeks into its run performances were cancelled due to the pandemic.

She reprised the role in autumn 2021 for 8 weeks in the West End at The Harold Pinter Theatre.

In the summer of 2022 Saunders played the role of Mother Superior in Sister Act the Musical for 6 weeks at the Eventim Apollo Hammersmith alongside Beverley Knight as Deloris Van Cartier.

Personal life
Saunders married Adrian Edmondson on 11 May 1985, in Cheshire. They have three daughters: singer-songwriter Ella Edmondson (b. 1986), actress Beattie Edmondson (b. 1987), and actress Freya Edmondson (b. 1990). She has five grandchildren.

In July 2010, Saunders announced that she had been diagnosed with breast cancer the previous October, and was in remission following a lumpectomy, chemotherapy, and radiotherapy.

Saunders published her autobiography, Bonkers: My Life in Laughs, in October 2013.

She has volunteered for Dress for Success, a non-profit organisation which gives free clothes and advice about job interviews to women who are unemployed.

Awards and recognition
Along with Dawn French, Saunders declined an OBE in 2001.

In 2003, she was listed in The Observer as one of the 50 funniest acts in British comedy. Saunders was placed 93rd out of E!'s 100 Sexiest British Stars. She also came 18th for Best British Role Models for teenage girls in Britain according to Good Housekeeping Magazine.

Saunders was awarded an honorary doctorate by the University of Exeter in July 2007. In July 2011, she was awarded an honorary doctorate by Edge Hill University.

In 2005, Saunders was named the fourth funniest woman in Britain in a poll of 4,000 women. To date, she has been nominated for and received many awards, including:

Won
1991: Writers' Guild of Great Britain Award for TV Light Entertainment – French & Saunders.
1993: BAFTA Television Award for Best Comedy Series for – Absolutely Fabulous (shared with Jon Plowman and Bob Spiers)
1993: Writers' Guild of Great Britain Award TV for Situation Comedy – Absolutely Fabulous.
1993: British Comedy Award for Top Female Performer
2002: Honorary Rose Award – awarded with Dawn French
2005: People's Choice Award for Favourite Movie Villain – Shrek 2
2009: BAFTA Fellowship – awarded with Dawn French
2012: BAFTA Television Award for Best Female Performance In a Comedy Programme – Absolutely Fabulous

Nominated
1993: BAFTA Television Award for Best Light Entertainment Performance for – Absolutely Fabulous
1993: British Comedy Award for Best Comedy Actress – Absolutely Fabulous
1994: British Comedy Award for Best TV Comedy Actress – Absolutely Fabulous
1995: BAFTA Television Award for Best Comedy Series for – Absolutely Fabulous (shared with Jon Plowman and Bob Spiers)
1996: BAFTA Television Award for Best Comedy Series for – Absolutely Fabulous (shared with Jon Plowman and Bob Spiers)
1997: BAFTA Television Award for Best Comedy Series for – Absolutely Fabulous (shared with Jon Plowman, Bob Spiers and Janice Thomas)

Television

Film

Writer
2016: Ab Fab: The Movie (writer)
2012: Viva Forever! (writer)
2006: Jam & Jerusalem (16 episodes, 2006–2009)
2008: French and Saunders Still Alive (V) (writer)
2007: The Life and Times of Vivienne Vyle (6 episodes, 2007)
2007: A Bucket o' French & Saunders (5 episodes, 2007)
2001: Absolument fabuleux (creator: TV series Absolutely Fabulous)
2000: Mirrorball (TV) (writer)
2000: French & Saunders Live (V) (writer)
1999: The Nearly Complete and Utter History of Everything (TV) (writer)
1998: Absolutely Fabulous: A Life (V) (writer)
1998: Absolutely Fabulous: Absolutely Not! (V) (original idea)
1996: Roseanne (1 episode, 1996)
1993: French and Saunders Live (V) (writer)
1992: Absolutely Fabulous (38 episodes, 1992–2012)
1991: Comic Relief (TV) (uncredited)
1987: French and Saunders (38 episodes, 1987–2005)
1986: Comic Relief (TV) (writer)
1984: The Comic Strip Presents... (2 episodes, 1984–1986)
1985: Girls on Top TV series (unknown episodes)
1981: The Comic Strip (TV) (writer)

Bibliography
Absolutely Fabulous: Continuity
Absolutely Fabulous (scripts from the show)
Absolutely Fabulous 2 (more scripts from the show)
A Feast of French and Saunders (with Dawn French)
Autobiography
Bonkers: My Life in Laughs (Viking, 2013)

References

External links

1958 births
Living people
20th-century English actresses
20th-century English comedians
20th-century English women writers
20th-century English writers
21st-century English actresses
21st-century English comedians
21st-century English women writers
21st-century English writers
Alumni of the Royal Central School of Speech and Drama
BAFTA fellows
Best Female Comedy Performance BAFTA Award (television) winners
Comedians from Lincolnshire
English autobiographers
English film actresses
English stage actresses
English television actresses
English television writers
English voice actresses
English women comedians
People educated at St Paul's Girls' School
People from Sleaford, Lincolnshire
The Comic Strip
Women autobiographers
British women television writers